Tancredi is an opera by the composer Gioachino Rossini, based on the character in Torquato Tasso's Jerusalem Delivered.

Tancredi may also refer to:

People 
 Tancred Tancredi (c. 1185-9 to 1241), also called Tancred of Siena, an Italian ecclesiastic, missionary, and one of the first generation of Dominican friars
 Tancredi Fassini (1900–1943), Italian ice hockey player
 Tancredi Palamara (born 1968), Italian rock guitarist, known professionally as Tank Palamara
 Tancredi Pasero (1893–1983), an Italian bass singer
 Filippo Tancredi (1655–1722), an Italian painter
 Franco Tancredi (born 1955), retired professional Italian goalkeeper
 Gonzalo Tancredi (born 1963), an Uruguayan astronomer
 Melissa Tancredi (born 1981), Canadian soccer forward
 Roberto Tancredi (born 1944), retired Italian professional goalkeeper

Fictional characters 
Tancredi, a character in the Italian epic poem  Jerusalem Delivered 1581, by Torquato Tasso
 Tancredi Falconieri, a character in the novel The Leopard by Giuseppe Tomasi di Lampedusa
 Sara Tancredi, from the American television series, Prison Break, played by Sarah Wayne Callies
 Frank Tancredi, the father of Sara in the American television series, Prison Break

Astronomy 
 5088 Tancredi, main-belt asteroid

Art and literature
 Gesta Tancredi, narrative of the First Crusade
 Il combattimento di Tancredi e Clorinda, musical work by Claudio Monteverdi, based on Tasso

See also
 Tancred (name)
 Tancred (disambiguation)